The Telling of Lies is a 1986 novel by Timothy Findley. A murder mystery, the novel centres on Vanessa Van Horne, a landscape architect who witnesses the apparent murder of pharmaceutical mogul Calder Maddox at the seaside Aurora Sands Hotel in Maine.

Following the book's paperback publication in the United States in 1988, the novel won the Edgar Award for Best Paperback Original in 1989.

References

Novels by Timothy Findley
1986 Canadian novels
Canadian mystery novels
Edgar Award-winning works
Viking Press books